The 1994 RTHK Top 10 Gold Songs Awards was held in 1994 for the 1993 music season.

Top 10 song awards
The top 10 songs (十大中文金曲) of 1994 are as follows.

Other awards

References
 RTHK top 10 gold song awards 1994

RTHK Top 10 Gold Songs Awards
Rthk Top 10 Gold Songs Awards, 1994
Rthk Top 10 Gold Songs Awards, 1994